The Ghost of a Flea is a miniature painting by the English poet, painter and printmaker William Blake, held in the Tate Gallery, London. Measuring only , it is executed in a tempera mixture with gold, on a mahogany-type tropical hardwood panel. It was completed between 1819 and 1820, as part of a series depicting "Visionary Heads" commissioned by the watercolourist and astrologist John Varley (1778–1842). Fantastic, spiritual art was popular in Britain from around 1770 to 1830, and during this time Blake often worked on unearthly, supernatural panels to amuse and amaze his friends.

At 21.4 cm × 16.2 cm the work is a greatly reduced miniature portrait. Blake generally worked on a small scale; most of his illuminated pages, engravings and many of his paintings are only inches high. Although Ghost of a Flea is one of Blake's smallest works, it is monumental in its imagination. Its tiny scale achieves drama in contrasting the muscular bulk and apparent power of the creature against its incarnation in the panel as an insect.

Background

Blake first met John Varley in the autumn of 1818. Varley was 21 years younger than the artist, 
and has been described as a "genial 17-stone bear of a man." A student of astrology and zodiacal physiognomy, Varley held a strong belief in the existence of spirits, but was frustrated by his inability to see them. Thus he was drawn to Blake, who claimed to have seen visions daily since when as a small child he had seen a tree "filled with angels, bright angelic wings bespangling every bough like stars."<ref name="Dixon">Graham-Dixon, Andrew. "The Ghost of a Flea by William Blake, c. 1819–20". Sunday Telegraph,: "In the Picture; No. 32", November 26, 2000. Retrieved on November 08, 2008.</ref> The two would often gather late at night in Varley's house, and played a game in which Varley would attempt to summon the spirit of a historical or mythological person. On the appearance of the spirit, Blake would then attempt to sketch their likeness.

According to Varley, the imagery of a Flea came to Blake during an 1819 séance. Varley described the scene:
 
Blake's Victorian biographer Alexander Gilchrist (1828–1861) wrote that, three decades earlier in 1790, "Blake, for the only time in his life, saw a ghost... Standing one evening at his garden-door in Lambeth, and chancing to look up, he saw a horrible grim figure, 'scaly, speckled, very awful,' stalking downstairs towards him. More frightened than ever before or after, he took to his heels, and ran out of the house."

Although not directly stated by Gilchrist, there is a close connection between the ghost and the later The Head of the Ghost of a Flea.

Blake often said that he was joined by invisible sitters as he drew them, including, he claimed, a number of angels, Voltaire, Moses and the Flea, who told him that "fleas were inhabited by the souls of such men as were by nature blood thirsty to excess." In his obituary, it was stated that, "The flea communicated to Mr. Blake what passed, as related to himself, at the Creation. 'It was first intended,' said he (the flea) 'to make me as big as a bullock; but then when it was considered from my construction, so armed—and so powerful withal, that in proportion to my bulk, (mischievous as I now am) that I should have been a too mighty destroyer; it was determined to make me—no bigger than I am."

In both his artwork and poetry, Blake often gave personality and human form to such abstractions as time, death, plague and famine. Fleas are often associated with uncleanliness and degradation; in this work, the artist sought to magnify a flea into "a monsterous creature whose bloodthirsty instinct was imprinted on every detail of its appearance, with 'burning eyes which long for moisture', and a 'face worthy of a murderer'."

Description
The muscular and nude Flea is depicted using its jutting tongue to gorge on a bowl of blood. Part human, part vampire and part reptile, the beast strides from right to left between heavy and richly patterned curtains. In his left hand he holds an acorn and in his right a thorn, both items drawn from the tradition of fairy iconography. His massive neck is similar to that of a bull, and holds a disproportionally small head, marked by glaring eyes and open jaws, and a venomous slithering tongue. According to the art critic Jonathan Jones, the flea is depicted as an "evil, gothic, grotesque stalking through a starry realm between stage curtains."Ghost of a Flea is distinguished by its innovative use of gold leaf. Beneath the curtain folds, the flesh of the flea and bright stars, Blake placed a thin foil of "white" gold which he made from gold-silver alloy. He then used a brush and powdered gold foil made into paint to colour much of the minute detail. Blake overlaid using thick brown paint derived from sugar, gum and glue.

The painting was created using Blake's distinctive tempera technique, which he describes in the lower right of the panel, beneath the shell gold signature, as "fresco". On the reverse of the panel is written, "The Vision of the Spirit that inhabits the body of a Flea, and which appeared to the late Mr. Blake, the Designer of the vignettes for Blair Grave and the Book of Job. The Visions first appeared to him in my presence, and after wards till he had finished this picture. The Flea drew blood on this." Today the work is in relatively poor condition, partly due to the technique employed by Blake. Areas of the surface have cracked and dulled with age.

Although Blake was singular in his ability to directly transcribe visions onto canvas or paper, a number of visual and literary sources can be detected in this work. The art historian Hope Werness suggested that The Flea may be inspired by a 1665 work by early microscopist Robert Hooke (1635–1703), whose Micrographia includes a drawing of a flea microscopically observed.

Comparisons have been made to Henry Fuseli's monstrous imps, while the image of the flea echos figures in Blake's earlier work, and his scaly body is similar to the monster in his 1805 pen and ink drawing Pestilence: Death of the First Born. In 2006, the Tate hung The Ghost of a Flea and William Raddon's 1827 engraving after Fuseli's The Nightmare side by side in  "The Nightmare in Modern Culture" room of their "Fuseli, Blake and the Romantic Imagination" exhibition."The Nightmare in Modern Culture. Tate, 2006. Retrieved on August 9, 2009.

Reception
During his lifetime, Blake's prints were described as the work of a madman. This view was reinforced when word spread that Blake was inspired through visions, and, according to G. E. Bentley, "So plain was Blake's madness to some that they assumed he must have been confined in a madhouse" and few were willing to believe that the artist actually saw anything.

In 2006, the painting was described by The New York Times as Blake's "quite strangest and certainly most Gothic work".

ProvenanceThe Ghost of a Flea was purchased by Varley around 1820, and later passed to his son Albert Varley. A label on the reverse of the canvas states that the panel was sold by Albert in February 1878, a fact confirmed by an inscription written by the poet and artist William Bell Scott (1811–1890) on the inside back cover of the Blake-Varley Sketchbook which reads, "I have since getting this book [in 1870], bought the painting of the "Ghost" of the Flea, from Mr Varley of Oakley St. Chelsea, son of John Varley". On 14 July 1892 it was sold at Sotheby's to W. Graham Robertson for £10.50.

It was first exhibited at Carfax, Oxford, in 1906. In preparation for this showing, the panel was partially cleaned of dust. It was further treated when the exhibition ended by Stanley Littlejohn (1877–1917), who, in the words of the Blake collector W. Graham Robertson, lifted "the veil of darkness...from it without any impairing of the surface, and the picture now appears exactly as described by Allan Cunningham.  The colours, though deep, are clear and brilliant; the gold, used to heighten the lights, shines with its old power, and on the floor, between the feet of the striding." It was first displayed at the Tate on loan in 1913, and donated to the gallery by Robertson in 1948. The sketch on paper, along with several other of Blake's drawings and watercolours, had been donated to the gallery in 1940 by Miss Alice G.E. Carthew.

Notes

Sources
 Bentley, G.E. The Stranger From Paradise. New Haven: Yale University Press, 2003. 
 Bentley, G.E. Blake Records Oxford: Clarendon, 1969
 Butlin, Martin. William Blake 1757–1827. London: Tate Gallery Collections, V, 1990. ASIN B00188DELU
 Kuijsten, Marcel. Reflections on the Dawn of Consciousness: Julian Jaynes's Bicameral Mind Theory Revisited. Julian Jaynes Society, 2007. 
 Myrone, Martin. The Blake Book. London: Tate Gallery, 2007. 
 Raine, Kathleen. William Blake. London: Thames and Hudson, 1970. 
 Robertson, Graham. The Blake Collection of W. Graham Robertson. London: Faber and Faber Limited, 1952
 Spencer, Terence. The Iconography of Crabtree. The Crabtree Orations 1954–1994. London: Crabtree Foundation, 1997
 Townsend, Joyce (ed.). William Blake: The Painter at Work. London: Tate Publishing, 2003. 
 Werness, Hope D. The Continuum Encyclopaedia of Animal Symbolism in World Art. Continuum International Publishing Group, 2004. 
 "William Blake" (obituary). Literary Chronicle'', 1 September 1827

External links

 Tate display caption from 2004
 Tate display caption for the sister drawing The Head of the Ghost of a Flea
 See the drawing in Tate Britain's Prints and Drawings Rooms

1820 paintings
Collection of the Tate galleries
Art by William Blake